Fillongley Provincial Park is a provincial park in British Columbia, Canada, located on the east side of Denman Island, southeast of Courtenay, British Columbia, and facing Georgia Strait.

References

Provincial Parks of the Gulf Islands
Provincial parks of British Columbia
1954 establishments in British Columbia
Protected areas established in 1954